Mario Vogt (born 17 January 1992 in Stuttgart) is a German cyclist, who currently rides for German amateur team RSC Schönaich.

Major results

2008
 1st  Road race, National Novice Road Championships
2010
 1st Overall Tour du Valromey
1st Stages 1 & 4
 1st Overall Regio-Tour
 2nd Overall Internationale Niedersachsen-Rundfahrt
1st Stage 1
 3rd Overall Grand Prix Rüebliland
2014
 4th Overall Memorial Grundmanna I Wizowskiego
1st  Mountains classification
1st  Young rider classification
2016
 1st  National Hill Climb Championships
 1st  Team time trial, National Road Championships
 6th Overall Flèche du Sud
2017
 8th Overall Tour de Tochigi
 9th Overall Tour de Filipinas
1st  Mountains classification
2018
 5th Overall Tour of Cartier
1st Prologue
 6th Overall Tour de Ijen
 10th Overall Tour of Fatih Sultan Mehmet
2019
 1st  Overall Tour de Iskandar Johor
 Tour de Filipinas
1st Points classification
1st Stages 2 & 5
2021 
 1st Stage 8 Tour du Faso

References

External links

Profile at rad-net.de

1992 births
Living people
German male cyclists
Sportspeople from Stuttgart
Cyclists from Baden-Württemberg